Elastic is a 2002 studio album by American jazz saxophonist Joshua Redman. The album was released on September 10, 2002, by Warner Bros. label.

Background
The album is positioned as the Redman's first full-length record with electric instruments—after eight acoustic albums. Also, Elastic follows the self-titled CD by Yaya3, which features the same lineup: Redman with keyboardist Sam Yahel and drummer Brian Blade. The Yaya3 CD came out on Loma Records, once the R&B subsidiary of Warner Bros. The concept for Yaya3 and Elastic began when Redman started playing with Yahel and Blade at the New York's Small's club in the late 1990s.

Reception
David R. Adler of Allmusic wrote "Coming fast on the heels of Redman's collaborative Yaya3 date with the same players (organist Sam Yahel and drummer Brian Blade), Elastic is more about pop/soul-funk than jazz, but it doesn't sacrifice any of Yaya3's organic feeling and improvisational focus. Here Yahel plays not only Hammond organ, but also Fender Rhodes, clavinet, and other assorted electric keys. Redman makes liberal use of overdubbing and signal processing, much of which is surprisingly subtle. The result is quite a lot of sound for three people, quite a lot of inspired blowing, and quite a lot of stylistic ground covered." John Fordham of The Guardian noted "...the afterglow, as so often with recent Redman discs, is surprisingly brief." The Buffalo News review by Jeff Simon noted, "Not a bad thing to be by a long shot. There is a ton of infectious grooves on this disc... It's a lot of fun. But, unlike his ambitious counterpart and contemporary James Carter, it only confirms that Redman is the authentic monster tenor of slackers everywhere."

Stuart Nicholson of JazzTimes added, "Redman remains more student than trailblazer here, more the eternal protege. But that’s enough, for now-hell, Elastic is a fun disc-and more searching questions about the emotional depth of his work can wait for another day." C. Andrew Hovan of All About Jazz wrote, "Although an audience's reaction to any artistic endeavor is ultimately personal, some pieces seem to speak with great fluency and attraction and others are more difficult to decipher. Redman's work here not only speaks with clarity but it also rewards repeated exposure. Any disc that keeps finding itself in my player, when so many don't merit much past two or three spins, recommends itself and Elastic does just that."

Track listing

Personnel
Musicians
 Joshua Redman – tenor saxophone, alto saxophone, soprano saxophone 
 Sam Yahel – grand piano, electric piano (Fender Rhodes, Wurlitzer), organ (Hammond B3), synthesizer (Yamaha CS150, Korg MS 2000), clavinet (Hohner)
 Brian Blade – drums
 Bashiri Johnson – tambourine (tracks: 1, 2, 6, 7), shaker (tracks: 2, 6, 9), congas & bongos (track: 7)

Production
 Joshua Redman – producer
 Matt Pierson – producer
 Sam Yahel – producer (additional production)
 James Farber – co-producer
 Dana Watson – project coordinator
 James Farber – engineer (recording, mixing)
 Greg Calbi – engineer (mastering)
 Andy Snitzer – engineer (digital editing)
 Todd Parker – engineer (additional engineering)
 Keith Nelson – engineer (assistant)

Charts

References

External links
 

Joshua Redman albums
2002 albums
Post-bop albums
Warner Records albums
Albums produced by Matt Pierson